The 2014–15 William & Mary Tribe men's basketball team represented the College of William & Mary during the 2014–15 NCAA Division I men's basketball season. The Tribe were led by twelfth year head coach Tony Shaver. The team played its home games at Kaplan Arena and were members of the Colonial Athletic Association (CAA). This was the 110th season of the collegiate basketball program at William & Mary. They finished the season 20–13, 12–6 in CAA play to finish in a four way tie for the CAA regular season championship. They advanced to the championship game of the CAA tournament where they lost to Northeastern. As a regular season champion, and #1 seed in their conference tournament, they received an automatic bid to the National Invitation Tournament where they lost in the first round to Tulsa.

Previous season
The team will look to improve upon their 20–12 (10–6 CAA) record from the 2013–14 season that saw the team fall just short of a conference championship in a 75–74 loss to Delaware in the championship game of the 2014 CAA men's basketball tournament. William & Mary will look to earn their first  postseason bid since 2010.

Departures

Incoming transfers

Recruiting Class of 2014

Recruiting Class of 2015

Roster

Program notes 
On December 19, 2014, head coach Tony Shaver won his 500th career NCAA game after the Tribe defeated Washington College, 86–46.
On January 10, 2015, junior guard Terry Tarpey recorded the first triple double in program history (in its 110th season) during William & Mary's 81–73 win against James Madison. Tarpey had 18 points, 11 rebounds, and 10 assists. 
On January 14, 2015, William & Mary recorded the largest comeback win in program history against UNC Wilmington, winning 76–72, after trailing by 22 points earlier in the game.
On February 25, 2015, Marcus Thornton scored his 2,053rd career point in a 65–50 win against Towson, thus breaking the previous record (2,052) set by Chet Giermak during the 1949–50 season. It was the longest-standing career points record (65 years) for any NCAA program at the time.
On June 25, 2015, Thornton was selected in the 2015 NBA draft, taken in the second round (45th overall) to the Boston Celtics. He was the first William & Mary player drafted since Keith Cieplicki in 1985 (7th round, 161st overall), but the first to do so in the NBA's modern draft format (only two rounds).

Schedule 

|-
!colspan=9 style="background:#115740; color:#B9975B;"| Non-conference regular season

|-
!colspan=9 style="background:#115740; color:#B9975B;"| Conference regular season

|-
!colspan=9 style="background:#115740; color:#B9975B;"| CAA Tournament

|-
!colspan=9 style="background:#115740; color:#B9975B;"| NIT

See also
2014–15 William & Mary Tribe women's basketball team

References

William And Mary
William And Mary
William & Mary Tribe men's basketball seasons
William and Mary Tribe men's basketball
William and Mary Tribe men's basketball